AD 39 (XXXIX) was a common year starting on Thursday (link will display the full calendar) of the Julian calendar. At the time, it was known as the Year of the Consulship of Augustus and Caesianus (or, less frequently, year 792 Ab urbe condita). The denomination AD 39 for this year has been used since the early medieval period, when the Anno Domini calendar era became the prevalent method in Europe for naming years.

Events

By place

Roman Empire 
 Tigellinus, minister and favorite of the later Roman emperor Nero, is banished for adultery with Caligula's sisters.
 Gaius Caesar Augustus Germanicus (Caligula) and Gnaeus Domitius Corbulo become Roman consuls.  
 Caligula orders a floating bridge to be built using ships as pontoons, stretching for two miles from Baiae to the neighboring port of Puteoli.  
 Agrippa I, king of Judaea, successfully accuses Herod Antipas, tetrarch of Galilee and Perea, of conspiracy against Caligula. Antipas is exiled and Agrippa receives his territory.
 Legio XV Primigenia and XXII Primigenia are levied by Caligula for the German frontier.
 Caligula's campaign into Germany is stopped by a conspiracy led by Cassius Chaerea. Even though he never even reaches Germany, Caligula proclaims himself victorious and orders a triumph.
 Caligula orders that a statue of himself be placed in the Temple in Jerusalem.  The governor of Syria, Publius Petronius, who is responsible for having an erecting  the statue, faces mass demonstrations by Jews of the region and manages to delay construction of the statue until the death of Caligula in AD 41.
 Philo leads a Jewish delegation to Rome to protest the anti-Jewish conditions in Alexandria.

Vietnam 
 The Trung Sisters resist the Chinese influences in Vietnam.
</onlyinclude>

Births 
 November 3 – Marcus Annaeus Lucanus, Roman poet (d. AD 65)
 December 30 – Titus Flavius, Roman emperor (d. AD 81)
 Julia Drusilla, daughter of Caligula (d. AD 41)

Deaths 
 Gnaeus Cornelius Lentulus Gaetulicus, Roman consul
 Marcus Aemilius Lepidus, Roman politician (b. AD 6)
 Seneca the Elder, Roman rhetorician (approximate date)

References 

0039

als:30er#39